Cenovis is a dark brown food paste from Switzerland consisting of yeast extract.  It is similar to English Marmite, Brazilian Cenovit, and Australian Vegemite. It is rich in vitamin B1. It is used to flavour soups, sausages, and salads. The most popular way to consume Cenovis, however, is to spread it on a slice of buttered bread, as stated on the product's packaging (it can also be blended directly into butter, and then spread on bread, or used as a filling in croissants and buns).

Cenovis is popular in Switzerland (particularly Romandie).  It was developed in Rheinfelden in 1931, on the initiative of a master brewer named Alex Villinger, and was subsequently produced  by the company Cenovis SA.

In 1999, the Swiss banker Michel Yagchi purchased the brand, and along with Didier Fischer and Frank Guemara relaunched it applying modern marketing methods.

On 29 February 2008, Michel Yagchi transferred the brand, acquired in 1999, to Gustav Gerig AG, an Aargau company, and the product thereby returned to its canton of origin.

The company presents the following story behind Cenovis:
"In 1931, a brewer recycled the yeast used for the fermentation of beer: vegetal substances very rich in vitamin B1. After several tests, the product was perfected and a group of Swiss brewers launched Cenovis; the product was an immediate success and the famous spread was so good that from 1955 it was included in the rations for Swiss soldiers... Healthy and strong soldiers!"

See also

 Culinary Heritage of Switzerland
 List of brand name condiments
 List of spreads
 Marmite
 Promite
 Vegemite
 Vitam-R

References

External links

Cenovis SA. The makers of Cenovis (in German)
Marmite, Vegemite, and...Cenovis? A tale of salty yeast spreads

Yeast extract spreads
Brand name condiments
Food and drink companies of Switzerland
Umami enhancers
Products introduced in 1931
Culinary Heritage of Switzerland
Food paste